The 1908–09 Yorkshire Cup was the fourth occasion on which the  Yorkshire Cup competition, a Rugby league tournament, was held. The final was a repeat of the previous year's final between holder's Hunslet and the runner-up Halifax and the third meeting between the two club's in the County Cup final, as well as 1907–08, the two had met in the 1905–06 final. The match was won by Halifax who won 9–5, played at Belle Vue, in the Wakefield. The attendance was 13,000 and receipts were £356.

First round 
The draw for the first round was made at the Yorkshire committee meeting on 16 July 1908. With 13 teams entered into the competition, the first round comprised five ties filled by the first ten teams drawn. The three teams not drawn were given a bye to the second round.  The teams with a bye were Bramley, Dewsbury and Hull.  All five ties were played on 10 October 1908.

Second round 
The second round draw was made on 12 October 1908. The ties were played on 24 October 1908.

Semi-finals 
The Yorkshire committee met on 29 October to conduct the draw for the semi-finals. The games were played on 14 November 1908.

Final 
Wakefield Trinity's Belle Vue was chosen as the venue for the final.

Halifax dominated the first half, building up a 7–0 half-time lead through a Little drop goal, a try by Hilton and the resulting conversion kicked by Little.  The second half saw Hunslet score a try through Randall which Goldthorpe converted but the final score went to Halifax as Little kicked a penalty.

See also 
1908–09 Northern Rugby Football Union season
Rugby league county cups

References

RFL Yorkshire Cup
Yorkshire Cup